Belene may refer to one of the following places in Bulgaria:

Belene, a town in Pleven Province
Belene Municipality
Belene Island on the Danube river
Belene labour camp, former forced labour camp
Belene Nuclear Power Plant, former planned nuclear power plant